WCTQ (92.1 FM) is a radio station broadcasting with a classic country music format. Licensed to Venice, Florida, United States, the station serves the Sarasota area. It is currently owned by iHeartMedia.

History
Before the 2011 holiday season, the then-WLTQ-FM played music with a hot AC format. On October 31, 2011, WLTQ-FM began playing Christmas music, branded as "Santa 92.1". Then, on December 26 at Midnight, the station changed to an adult contemporary format as "92.1 The Coast".

On February 24, 2016, WLTQ-FM changed its format to a simulcast of country-formatted WCTQ 106.5 FM in preparation for a new Spanish hits format on 106.5.

On February 29, 2016, WLTQ-FM changed callsigns to WCTQ, returning the country format and callsign to 92.1 after 17 years.

On September 7, 2022 WCTQ shifted its format from country to classic country.

CTQ Alumni
 Dave McClure (GM)
 Jim Davis (GM)
 Sherri Carlson (GM)
 Kim Ashley (former PD)
 Ron Merritt (former PD)
 John Brooks (former PD)
 Ed Couzins (former PD)
 Rob Carpenter (former PD)
 Rich Stevens (former PD)
 Mark "The Shark" Wilson (former PD and PM Drive)
 Sammy Cruise (former PD)
 Tim Jones (former PD)
 Frank Benny & Del Potts
 Frank & Del - morning drive)
 Tim & Willy (mornings)
 Maverick Johnson (longtime morning host)
 Pam Grey (middays)
 Tracy Black (midday host, Public Files Director 1991–2005)
 Heidi Decker (middays)
 Sara Jacobs (middays)
 Wanda Myles (morning co-host)
 Morgan (morning co-host)
 Sammi Jo Austin (morning co-host)
 Lulu Krysz (morning co-host)
 Frank Benny (news)
 Martin Haire (news)
 Scott Marino (traffic, weather & weekends)
 Ryan Rafferdy (news & weekends)
 Stormi Summers (host, 1992–1994)

Translator
WCTQ also broadcasts on the following translator:

Previous logo

References

External links

CTQ
Radio stations established in 1974
Classic country radio stations in the United States
IHeartMedia radio stations
1974 establishments in Florida